The 1959 Lafayette Leopards football team was an American football team that represented Lafayette College during the 1959 NCAA College Division football season. Lafayette finished third in the Middle Atlantic Conference, University Division, and second in the Middle Three Conference.

In their second year under head coach James McConlogue, the Leopards compiled a 5–4 record. Donald Nikles was the team captain.

In conference play, Lafayette had the second-most wins in the University Division, with a 4–3 record against conference opponents, but placed behind Gettysburg's 3–2 in win percentage. The Leopards went 1–1 against the Middle Three, losing to Rutgers and beating Lehigh.

Lafayette played its home games at Fisher Field on College Hill in Easton, Pennsylvania.

Schedule

References

Lafayette
Lafayette
Lafayette Leopards football seasons
Lafayette Leopards football